Mark Anthony Torres Chargualaf (born 3 January 1991) is a Guamanian footballer who plays as a defender.

References 

Living people
1991 births
Guamanian footballers
Guam international footballers
Association football defenders
Chamorro people